Qishan County is a county in the west of Guanzhong, Shaanxi province, China, under the administration of the prefecture-level city of Baoji. It was the site of Zhouyuan, the first capital of the Zhou Dynasty (1066–256 BCE). Historically, the site was also known as Qiyi or Qishan.  It is located in Fengchu township on the Weishui River to the south of Mt. Qi. Many Zhou-era artifacts including bronzeware have been found here. These are now housed in a museum on the site.

Administrative divisions
As 2020, Qishan County is divided to 9 towns.

Towns

Climate

References

County-level divisions of Shaanxi
Baoji